Malmö FF competed in Allsvenskan and Svenska Cupen for the 2001 season. The club was back in Allsvenskan after one season in Superettan. Zlatan Ibrahimović was sold to AFC Ajax in the summer of 2001 after heavy discussions which raised the price tag to approximately €9 million, the largest transfer sum ever recorded in Swedish football history.

Players

Squad stats

|}

Competitions

Allsvenskan

League table

Matches

Club

Kit

|
|

Other information

References
 

Malmö FF seasons
Malmo FF